Silvia Treimer (born 29 March 1970) is a German ski mountaineer.

Treimer was born in Berchtesgaden and lives in Rosenheim. She is married to the mountain guide Christian Treimer with one daughter named Anna, and works as judicial officer in Rosenheim.

Selected results 
 2003:
 3rd, European Cup team
 5th, European Championship team race (together with Christine Echtler-Schleich)
 2004:
 3rd, European Cup team
 9th, World Championship team race (together with Christine Echtler-Schleich)
 10th, World Championship combination ranking
 2005:
 3rd, European Championship relay race (together with Judith Graßl and Barbara Gruber)
 3rd, Mountain Attack race
 9th, European Championship team race (together with Christine Echtler-Schleich)
 2006:
 4th, World Championship relay race (together with Judith Graßl, Barbara Gruber and Stefanie Koch)
 10th, World Championship team race (together with Christine Echtler-Schleich)
 2007:
 2nd, German Championship team
 3rd, Trofeo Mezzalama (together with Judith Graßl and Stefanie Koch)
 3rd, Mountain Attack race
 4th, European Championship relay race (together with Judith Graßl and Stefanie Koch)

Patrouille des Glaciers 

 2006: 3rd, together with Judith Graßl and Stefanie Koch
 2008: 4th, together with Judith Graßl and Silvia Treimer

External links 
 Silvia Treimer at skimountaineering.com

References 

1970 births
Living people
German female ski mountaineers
People from Berchtesgaden
Sportspeople from Upper Bavaria